Yaldā Night ( shab-e yalda) or Chelle Night (also Chellah Night,  shab-e chelle) is an ancient festival in Iran, Iraqi Kurdistan, Afghanistan, Azerbaijan and Turkey celebrated on the winter solstice. This corresponds to the night of December 20/21 (±1) in the Gregorian calendar, and to the night between the last day of the ninth month (Azar) and the first day of the tenth month (Dey) of the Iranian solar calendar.

The festival is celebrated in Iran and other historically Iranian-influenced regions, including Azerbaijan, Iraqi Kurdistan, Balochi areas, Afghanistan and Tajikistan. The longest and darkest night of the year is a time when friends and family gather together to eat, drink and read poetry (especially Hafez) and the Shahnameh until well after midnight. Fruits and nuts are eaten and pomegranates and watermelons are particularly significant. The red color in these fruits symbolizes the crimson hues of dawn and glow of life. The poems of Divan-e Hafez, which can be found in the bookcases of most Iranian families, are read or recited on various occasions such as this festival and Nowruz. Shab-e Yalda was officially added to Iran's List of National Treasures in a special ceremony in 2008.

Names 
The longest and darkest night of the year marks "the night opening the initial forty-day period of the three-month winter", from which the name Chelleh, "fortieth", derives. There are all together three 40-day periods, one in summer, and two in winter. Shab-e Chelleh is the night opening the "big Chelleh" period, that is the night between the last day of autumn and the first day of winter. The other name of the festival, 'Yaldā', is ultimately borrowing from Syriac-speaking Christians. According to Dehkhoda, "Yalda is a Syriac word meaning birthday, and because people have adapted Yalda night with the nativity of Messiah, it's called the name; however, the celebration of Christmas (Noël) established on December 25, according to researchers, is originally the celebration of the advent of the Mithra (Mehr [Sun]) which Christian in the fourth century AD set as the birthday of Jesus. Yalda is the beginning of winter and the last night of autumn, and it is the longest night of the year". In the 1st century, significant numbers of Eastern Christians were settled in Parthian and Sasanian territories, where they had received protection from religious persecution. Through them, Iranians (i.e. Parthians, Persians etc.) came in contact with Christian religious observances, including, it seems, Nestorian Christian Yalda, which in Syriac (a Middle Aramaic dialect) literally means "birth" but in a religious context was also the Syriac Christian proper name for Christmas, and which—because it fell nine months after Annunciation—was celebrated on eve of the winter solstice. The Christian festival's name passed to the non-Christian neighbors and although it is not clear when and where the Syriac term was borrowed into Persian, gradually 'Shab-e Yalda' and 'Shab-e Chelleh' became synonymous and the two are used interchangeably.

History 
“Yalda Night” was one of the holy nights in ancient Iran, included in the official calendar of the ancient Iranians from 502 BC during the time of Darius I. The festivities that take place on this night are an ancient tradition.

People of ancient times, were accustomed to the passing of seasons and natural contradictions throughout the year due to experience. They did their work and activities by rotating the sun and changing seasons and heights.

They noticed that in some seasons the days were very long; and as a result, in those days, they could use more sunlight. The belief arose that the light and brightness of the sun were a symbol of goodness and agreement; and that they were in battle with the darkness of the night. Ancient people, including Aryans and Indo-Europeans, found that the shortest days are the last days of autumn and the first night of winter; and immediately after that, the days gradually get longer and the nights shorter. So they called this night, “The night of sun’s birth (Mehr)”; and made it the beginning of the year.

Customs and traditions 
In Zoroastrian tradition the longest and darkest night of the year was a particularly inauspicious day, and the practices of what is now known as "Shab-e Chelleh/Yalda" were originally customs intended to protect people from evil (see dews) during that long night, at which time the evil forces of Ahriman were imagined to be at their peak. People were advised to stay awake most of the night, lest misfortune should befall them, and people would then gather in the safety of groups of friends and relatives, share the last remaining fruits from the summer, and find ways to pass the long night together in good company. The next day (i.e. the first day of Dae month) was then a day of celebration, and (at least in the 10th century, as recorded by Al-Biruni), the festival of the first day of Dae month was known as Ḵorram-ruz (joyful day) or Navad-ruz (ninety days [left to Nowruz]). Although the religious significance of the long dark night has been lost, the old traditions of staying up late in the company of friends and family have been retained in Iranian culture to the present day.

References to other older festivals held around the winter solstice are known from both Middle Persian texts as well as texts of the early Islamic period. This festival is generally assumed to have been originally on the winter solstice, and which gradually shifted through the introduction of intercalation. Al-Biruni also records an Adar Jashan festival of fire celebrated on the intersection of Adar day (9th) of Adar month (9th), which is the last autumn month. This was probably the same as the fire festival called Shahrevaragan (Shahrivar day of Shahrivar month), which marked the beginning of winter in Tokarestan. In 1979, journalist Hashem Razi theorized that Mehregan  the day-name festival of Mithra that in pre-Islamic times was celebrated on the autumn equinox and is today still celebrated in the autumn  had in early Islamic times shifted to the winter solstice. Razi based his hypothesis on the fact that some of the poetry of the early Islamic era refers to Mihragan in connection with snow and cold. Razi's theory has a significant following on the Internet, but while Razi's documentation has been academically accepted, his adduction has not. Sufism's Chella, which is a 40-day period of retreat and fasting, is also unrelated to winter solstice festival.

Food plays a central role in the present-day form of the celebrations. In most parts of Iran the extended family come together and enjoy a fine dinner. A wide variety of fruits and sweetmeats specifically prepared or kept for this night are served. Foods common to the celebration include watermelon, pomegranate, nuts, and dried fruit. These items and more are commonly placed on a korsi, which people sit around. In some areas it is custom that forty varieties of edibles should be served during the ceremony of the night of Chelleh.
Light-hearted superstitions run high on the night of Chelleh. These superstitions, however, are primarily associated with consumption. For instance, it is believed that consuming watermelons on the night of Chelleh will ensure the health and well-being of the individual during the months of summer by protecting him from falling victim to excessive heat or disease produced by hot humors. In Khorasan, there is a belief that whoever eats carrots, pears, pomegranates, and green olives will be protected against the harmful bite of insects, especially scorpions. Eating garlic on this night protects one against pains in the joints.
in khorasan one of the attractive ceremony was and still is preparing Kafbikh a kind of traditional Iranian sweet is made in Khorasan, specially in the cities of Gonabad and Birjand. This is made for Yalda.
After dinner the older individuals entertain the others by telling them tales and anecdotes. Another favorite and prevalent pastime of the night of Chelleh is fāl-e Ḥāfeẓ, which is divination using the Dīvān of Hafez (i.e. bibliomancy). It is believed that one should not divine by the Dīvān of Hafez more than three times, however, or the poet may get angry.
Activities common to the festival include staying up past midnight, conversation, drinking, reading poems out loud, telling stories and jokes, and, for some, dancing. Prior to the invention and prevalence of electricity, decorating and lighting the house and yard with candles was also part of the tradition, but few have continued this tradition. Another tradition is giving dried fruits and nuts and gift to family and friends specially to the bride, wrapped in tulle and tied with ribbon (similar to wedding and shower "party favors") in khorasan giving gift to the bride was obligatory.

In film 
The storyline of the 2019 Iranian film Yalda, a Night for Forgiveness is based on an actual top-rating Iranian reality television show which was actually aired during Ramadan, but which in the film, under dramatic licence, is aired on Yalda night. In the film, a young woman convicted of murder pleads for the daughter of the victim to grant her forgiveness and save her from the death penalty.

Japanese Winter Solstice Traditions 

in Japan Around December 20–23 each year,is the shortest day and longest night of the year. On this winter day, Japanese will observe and celebrate tōji, the winter solstice. The Origin of Toji (Winter Solstice) or  Dongzhi (solar term)
Rooted in the Chinese philosophy of ying & yang, the winter solstice in Japan symbolizes the harmony and balance of the life force.

Gallery

See also 
 Nowruz
 Mehregan
 Dongzhi (solar term)

Footnotes

References

Group 1

Group 2

External links 

 
 Article about Yalda night on Irpersiatour website

Festivals in Iran
December observances
Persian culture
Observances set by the Solar Hijri calendar
Winter events in Iran